is an active stratovolcano of the Kameda peninsula, which is itself part of the larger Oshima Peninsula. It is in the rural, eastern region of Hakodate, Hokkaido, Japan. Mount E is part of Esan Prefectural Natural Park.

Geology
Mount E consists of non-alkali, mafic, volcanic rock. The andesitic volcano is topped with a lava dome.

Eruptive history
Mount E last erupted on June 8, 1874. This eruption consisted of phreatic explosions, and was rated a 1 on the VEI scale.

The oldest recorded eruption started November 18, 1846. The eruption triggered lahars damaging several houses and causing fatalities.

Radiocarbon dating and tephrochronology indicate five other eruptions predating the historical records in the approximate years 1350, 550 BC, 1050 BC, 3900 BC ±100 years, 7050 BC. The eruption in 7050 BC was the largest with a VEI of 3.

References

External links 

 Esan - Japan Meteorological Agency 
  - Japan Meteorological Agency
 Esan - Geological Survey of Japan
 Esan: Global Volcanism Program - Smithsonian Institution

Stratovolcanoes of Japan
Volcanoes of Hokkaido
Mountains of Hokkaido